Cluff Lake Airport  is a decommissioned airstrip located near Cluff Lake mine in north-western Saskatchewan, Canada at the northern terminus of Highway 955.

This aerodrome served a now-closed uranium mine.

See also 
 List of airports in Saskatchewan
 List of defunct airports in Canada

References

External links
Page about this airport on COPA's Places to Fly airport directory

Defunct airports in Saskatchewan